James Prime (born 3 November 1960) is a Scottish musician best known as the keyboard player for rock band Deacon Blue. Prime also lectures at the University of the West of Scotland. Known as a Hammond/piano player, his talents have been sought after by John Martyn, Johnny Hallyday, Phil Cunningham, Eddi Reader and Little Richard..

Career

Altered Images
Born in Kilmarnock, East Ayrshire, Jim's career began properly as a session musician on an Altered Images tour of the US in 1980. Altered Images, famous for their singer Clare Grogan's voice on such hits as "Happy Birthday" (no 2, U.K hit), "I Could Be Happy", "See Those Eyes" and latterly a smash U.S top ten with "Don't Talk to Me about Love" finished a successful tour by splitting up. A disillusioned Grogan wanted to continue her acting success on Gregory's Girl by pursuing a role on the next Bill Forsyth film named
Comfort and Joy. Manager Gerry McElhone and brother Johnny McElhone were ahead of the game, forming and signing (in a week) the band Hipsway. Prime considered joining but made way for his erstwhile competitor Craig Armstrong.

Deacon Blue
Deacon Blue was formed in Glasgow in 1985 by Ricky Ross and comprised Prime, Graeme Kelling on guitar, vocalist Lorraine McIntosh, bass guitarist Ewen Vernal and Dougie Vipond on drums. Their 1987 debut album, Raintown, was well received and followed by others such as When The World Knows Your Name (1989) and Whatever You Say, Say Nothing (1993), with a succession of hits such as "Real Gone Kid" (no. 8 in the UK), "I'll Never Fall in Love Again" (no. 2) and "Twist and Shout" (no.10). The band grew to be one of Scotland's best-known acts of the 1980s, but split in 1994. They reformed later to produce several more albums; including Walking Back Home (1999), Homesick (2001), The Hipsters (2012), A New House (2014),Believers (2016) and City of Love (2020).

Other work

Prime went on to join a theatrical production of the experiences of a band of Govan boys in World War I entitled The Big Picnic (staged in the Harland and Wolff shipyard in Glasgow). During that time Prime was also enlisted as Hammond organ player for Johnny Hallyday and departed to France for a two-year stint with Hallyday's band. The band, accompanied by various guests (including Bryan Adams, Mick Jones) played a continuous sold-out 19 nights at the capacity Bercy Arena in Paris. He then worked with Hallyday on Lorada (1995) in the Guillaume Tell studios in Paris.

On his return, a call from Benny Gallagher led to Prime developing an idea to create a School of Music and Recording Technology (SMART). The University of Paisley (now the University of the West of Scotland) picked up on the idea, and now in its eleventh year, the Commercial Music course hosts 250 students. Lecturers include David Scott of The Pearlfishers, Paul McGeechan (Love and Money) Alan McCusker Thompson (The Painted Word), Allan Dumbreck (The Big Dish) and Jo Collinson-Scott (Jo Mango).

Discography

Studio albums
 Raintown (1987)
 When the World Knows Your Name (1989)
 Fellow Hoodlums (1991)
 Whatever You Say, Say Nothing (1993)
 Walking Back Home (1999) 
 Homesick (2001)
 The Hipsters (2012)
 A New House (2014)
 Believers (2016)
 City of Love (2020)
 Riding on the Tide of Love (2021)

See also

 Deacon Blue
 Deacon Blue discography
 University of the West of Scotland

References

1960 births
Living people
People educated at the Glasgow Academy
Scottish keyboardists
Academics of the University of the West of Scotland
People from Kilmarnock
Deacon Blue members